The Imperial Austrian Army formed the land forces of the Austrian Empire. It arose from the remains of the Imperial Army of the Holy Roman Emperor after the dissolution of the Imperial Army and went in 1867 into the Joint Army of Austria-Hungary and the k.k. Landwehr over. In addition to the army, there was also the Austrian Navy. The army took part in the Napoleonic Wars until 1815, the First Italian War of Independence, the Hungarian Revolution of 1848, the Second Italian War of Independence, the Second Schleswig War, the Third Italian War of Independence and the Austro-Prussian War. Notable generals were Josef Radetzky, Karl Philipp of Schwarzenberg, Archduke Charles, Duke of Teschen, Frederick Bianchi and Julius von Haynau.

Story

Formation of the k.k. Army and Napoleonic Wars 
After the dissolution of the Holy Roman Empire of the German Nation, the Imperial Army became the Imperial-Royal Army. Because of several defeats by Napoleon, recently at Ulm & Austerlitz serious military reforms began under Archduke Charles in order not to repeat the previous setbacks in the future. In 1809, the Austrian Empire formed a new coalition against the French Empire and invaded the Kingdom of Bavaria, which was allied with the French.

After the Austrian army was defeated in the battles of Landshut & Eckmühl, it began to retreat into its own territory. Austria hoped that Prussia and Russia would intervene, but, partly because of the indecisiveness of the Prussian King Friedrich Wilhelm III. and the unwillingness of the Russian Tsar Alexander, did not materialize at first. After the Grande Armée had occupied Vienna, they met the Imperial-Royal Army at Aspern and Essling. The Battle of Aspern-Essling that followed ended in Napoleon's first defeat on the battlefield. At the Battle of Wagram, the Austrian army finally lost after heavy fighting and Austria was forced to sign the Peace of Schönbrunn, ending the Fifth Coalition.

In 1812, the Austrian Empire was forced to take part in the French invasion of Russia. Later Austria joined the Sixth Coalition the following year and played a crucial role in Napoleon's downfall. After being defeated at the Battle of Dresden, coalition forces withdrew into Bohemia and then invaded the Kingdom of Saxony again after a counteroffensive at Kulm. At the Battle of Leipzig, in which almost 600,000 soldiers took part, Napoleon was decisively defeated by Karl Philipp, Prince of Schwarzenberg and the Rhine Confederation founded by Napoleon dissolved. In the meantime the Austrians successfully retook the Dalmatian coast and fought to a stalemate in Northern Italy until Napoleon's defeat. In 1814, coalition armies captured Paris, forcing Napoleon to sign and abdicate the Peace Treaties of Fontainebleau and Paris. In the Seventh Coalition, the Austrian army fought mainly against the Kingdom of Naples under Joachim Murat, who was decisively defeated at the Battle of Tolentino by Frederick Bianchi.

Concert of Europe 
After the Napoleonic Wars, the k.k. Army put down the Carbonari uprisings in northern Italy in 1821 and the Kraców uprising in Galicia in 1846.

Italian & Hungarian Wars of Independence 
When revolutions broke out in 1848, the army was deployed to put them down. a popular uprising came about in Hungary, which initially aimed for more autonomy in the empire, but was finally fought for the independence of the Hungarian half of the empire. The k.k. Army under Radetzky & Julius von Haynau and the help of the Russian army secured the Habsburg Monarchy survival. The Kingdom of Piedmont-Sardinia, hoping to acquire Lombardy and Veneto from a Habsburg Empire distracted by the uprisings, Austria declared the War (First Italian War of Independence). Field Marshal Josef Radetzky, who led the army in northern Italy, had previously had to evacuate Milan because of violent revolts. After the Victory of Custozza, Piedmont-Sardinia signed an armistice. However, this was broken again the following year after several Italian states taken over by liberal politicians joined Piedmont. After a joint Italian army was again decisively defeated by Josef Radetzky at the Battle of Novara, the Piedmontese king Karl Albert abdicated in favor of his son Viktor Emmanuel II. and Piedmont signed a peace treaty with the Austrian Empire.

During the Sardinian War, the Imperial-Royal Army fought against the French Empire and the Kingdom of Piedmont-Sardinia. It was ultimately defeated by the Franco-Piedmontese troops at the Battle of Solferino. As a result of this defeat, 60 generals were retired and Ludwig von Benedek was appointed the new commander-in-chief to advance the modernization of the army.

Second Schleswig war and Austro-Prussian War 
In 1864, Austria and Prussia fought the Second Schleswig War over the duchies of Schleswig and Holstein. The Austrian army won every land battle in this war – the Battle of Königshügel, Battle of Sankelmark, Battle of Vejle and the taking of Danevirke and Frederica Fortress.

Austria & Prussia confronted each other for a last time to which German power should have leadership and unite. The war resulted with a disastrous Austrian defeat at Königgrätz, and although the Austrians outperformed the Italians at Custoza & Lissa, it didn't stop the Prussians from advancing to Vienna.

After the defeat in the German War of 1866, which Austria had waged together with the armed forces of the German Confederation as part of the federal execution against Prussia, Emperor Franz Joseph I was forced in 1866/1867 to confront Hungary, who had been in passive resistance since the failed attempts at secession in 1849, with the grant of partial sovereignty and the conversion of the monarchy, which had previously been run as a unit, into the so-called "dual monarchy". The Hungarian half of the empire received the right, in addition to the K.k. Army (now Joint Army, which was subordinate to the Minister of War) to set up its own territorial forces from 1867, the k.u. Landwehr (Hungarian: Királyi Honvédség) to set up. It was subordinate to the Hungarian Honvédelmi minisztérium.

The joint army of Austria-Hungary used the preceding designation k.k. until 1889, and from 1889 the corresponding k.u.k.

See also 
For the period after 1867:
 Armed Forces of Austria-Hungary
 Austro-Hungarian Army

References 

Military history of Austria-Hungary
1806 establishments in the Austrian Empire
1867 disestablishments in the Austrian Empire